There are more than 140 botanical gardens in Australia, some like the Australian National Botanic Gardens have collections consisting entirely of Australian native and endemic species; most have a collection that include plants from around the world. There are botanical gardens and arboreta in all states and territories of Australia, most are administered by local governments, some are privately owned.

Australian Capital Territory 
 Australian National Botanic Gardens -  Acton
 Lindsay Pryor National Arboretum - Yarralumla
 Westbourne Woods - Yarralumla

New South Wales 
 Albury Botanic Gardens - Albury
 Auburn Botanical Gardens - Auburn
 Australian Inland Botanic Gardens (formerly Sunraysia Oasis Botanical Gardens) - Buronga
 Bellingen Hospital Grounds - Bellingen
 Booderee National Park and Botanic Gardens (formerly  Jervis Bay Botanic Gardens) - Jervis Bay
 Brunswick Valley Heritage Park - Mullumbimby
 Burrendong Botanic Garden and Arboretum - Mumbil
 Cook Park - Orange
 Cowra Japanese Garden, Cowra
 Demesne Farm Minor Arboretum - Coomba Park
 Dulegal Native Plant Arboretum - Woolomin
 Elizabeth Park - Dubbo
 E G Waterhouse National Camellia Gardens - Sutherland
 Eurobodalla Regional Botanic Gardens - Batemans Bay
 Fruit Spirit Botanical Garden - Dorroughby
 Glenbrook Native Plant Reserve - Glenbrook
 Hunter Region Botanic Gardens - 
 Hunter Valley Gardens - Pokolbin
 Illawarra Grevillea Park - Bulli
 Ivanhoe Park Botanic Garden - Manly, New South Wales
 Joseph Banks Native Plants Reserve, Kareela - Sutherland
 Ku-ring-gai Wildflower Garden - St Ives
 Mayfield Garden - Oberon
 Mount Annan Botanic Garden - Mount Annan
 Mount Tomah Botanic Garden - Blue Mountains
 North Coast Regional Botanic Garden - Coffs Harbour
 Orange Botanic Gardens - Orange
 Picton Botanical Gardens - Picton
 Pilot Hill Arboretum - Tumut
 Royal Botanic Gardens - Sydney
 Southern Highlands Botanic Gardens - Southern Highlands, New South Wales
 Stony Range Botanic Garden - Dee Why
 Sylvan Grove Native Garden - Picnic Point
 Tamworth Regional Botanic Garden - Tamworth
 Tibooburra Outback Botanic Gardens - Tibooburra
 Tweed Shire Regional Botanic Gardens - Murwillumbah
 Wagga Wagga Botanic Gardens - Wagga Wagga
 Wirrimbirra Field Study Centre and Sanctuary - Bargo
 Wollongong Botanic Garden - Wollongong

Northern Territory 
 Alice Springs Desert Park - Alice Springs
 George Brown Darwin Botanic Gardens - Palmerston
 Olive Pink Botanic Garden -  Alice Springs

Queensland 
 Anderson Park - Townsville
 Atherton Arboretum - Atherton
 Brisbane Botanic Gardens, Mount Coot-tha - Brisbane
 Bundaberg Botanic Gardens - Bundaberg
 City Botanic Gardens - Brisbane
 Cooktown Botanic Gardens - Cooktown
 Daintree Wilderness Refugium - Mossman
 Dan Gleeson Memorial Gardens - Townsville
 Emerald Botanic Gardens - Emerald
 Fairhill Native Plants & Botanic Gardens - Yandina
 Flecker Botanical Gardens - Cairns
 Gayndah Botanical Gardens & Pioneer Place - Gayndah
 Gold Coast Regional Botanic Gardens/Rosser Park - Benowa
 Goondiwindi Botanic Gardens of the Western Woodlands - Goondiwindi
 Great Sandy Region Botanic Gardens - Hervey Bay
 Ingham Memorial Botanical Gardens - Ingham
 Kershaw Gardens - Rockhampton
 Lake McDonald Botanic Gardens - Cooroy
 Laurel Bank Park - Toowoomba
 Mackay Regional Botanic Gardens (formerly known as The Lagoons) - Mackay
 Maroochy Regional Bushland Botanic Garden - Tanawha
 Myall Park Botanic Garden - Glenmorgan
 Noosa Botanic Gardens - Noosa
 Queens Gardens - Townsville
 Queens Park - Mackay
 Queens Park Gardens - Toowoomba
 Redcliffe Botanic Gardens - Redcliffe
 Rivendell Botanical Gardens - Parkhurst, Rockhampton
 Rockhampton Botanic Gardens - Rockhampton
 Sherwood Arboretum - Sherwood
 Tamborine Mountain Botanic Gardens - Tamborine Mountain
 The Botanical Ark - Mossman
 Tondoon Botanic Gardens - Gladstone
 Townsville Palmetum - Townsville

South Australia 
 Adelaide Botanic Garden - Adelaide
 Australian Arid Lands Botanic Garden - Port Augusta West
 Barossa Bushgardens - Nuriootpa
 Beechwood Heritage Garden - Adelaide
 Black Hill Flora Centre - Adelaide
 Currency Creek Arboretum - Currency Creek
 Mount Lofty Botanic Garden - Piccadilly
 Nangawooka Flora Park - Victor Harbor
 Nindethana - Narrung
 Pangarinda Botanic Garden - Wellington East, South Australia
 Roxby Downs Arboretum - Roxby Downs
 Terowie Arid Lands Botanical Garden - Terowie
 Waite Arboretum - University of Adelaide
 Wittunga Botanic Garden - Blackwood

Tasmania 
 Cliff Grounds Reserve - Launceston
 Heritage Forest - Invermay
 Royal Tasmanian Botanical Gardens - Hobart
 The Tasmanian Arboretum - Devonport, Tasmania
 Tasmanian Bushland Garden - Buckland

Victoria 
 Ballarat Botanical Gardens - Ballarat
 Benalla Botanical Gardens - Benalla
 Buninyong Botanic Gardens - Buninyong
 Camperdown Botanic Gardens - Camperdown
 Castlemaine Botanic Gardens - Castlemaine
 Colac Botanic Gardens - Colac
 Dandenong Ranges Botanic Garden - Olinda
 Geelong Botanic Gardens - Geelong
 George Pentland Botanic Gardens - Frankston
 Gisborne Botanic Gardens - Gisborne
 Hamilton Botanic Gardens - Victoria
 Horsham Rural City Council Botanic Gardens - Horsham
 Karwarra Australian Native Botanic Garden  (Dandenong Ranges) Kalorama 
Keilor Botanic Gardens - Keilor
 Kyneton Botanic Gardens - Kyneton
 Malmsbury Botanical Gardens - Malmsbury
 Mornington Botanical Rose Gardens - Mornington
 Penshurst Botanic Gardens - Penshurst
 Portland Botanical Gardens - Portland
 Port Fairy Botanic Gardens - Port Fairy
 Royal Botanic Gardens - Cranbourne
 Royal Botanic Gardens - Melbourne
 Sale Botanic Gardens - Sale
 St Kilda Botanic Gardens - Melbourne
 Warrnambool Botanic Gardens  - Warrnambool
 White Hills Botanic Gardens - Bendigo
 Williamstown Botanic Gardens - Williamstown
 Wilson Botanic Park - Berwick
 Wombat Hill Botanical Gardens - Daylesford

Western Australia 
 Araluen Botanical Park - Roleystone
 Big Brook Forest Arboretum - Pemberton
 Coolgardie Arboretum - Kalgoorlie
 Derby Botanic Gardens - Derby
 Dryandra Inland Arboretum - Narrogin
 Esperance (Helms) Exotic & Indigenous Arboretum - Esperance
 Forest Arboretum - Pemberton
 Kalgoorlie Arboretum -  Kalgoorlie
 Kings Park and Botanic Garden - Perth
 Mount Martin Regional Botanic Park - Albany
 Wanneroo Botanic Gardens (privately owned and operated) - Wanneroo

External territories 
 Lord Howe Island Botanic Gardens - Lord Howe Island
 Norfolk Island Botanic Gardens - Norfolk Island

References 
 Wilson, J., Vallee, L. and Fagg, M. eds. 2006. Directory of Australian Botanic Gardens and Arboreta (broken link)

Australia
Botanical gardens